Laurence Stapleton (19 May 1893–1969) was an English footballer who played in the Football League for Nottingham Forest.

References

1893 births
1969 deaths
English footballers
Association football forwards
English Football League players
Basford United F.C. players
Nottingham Forest F.C. players
Heanor Town F.C. players
Shirebrook Miners Welfare F.C. players